Qarah Buteh (also Romanized as Qarah Būteh and Qareh Būteh) is a village in Ijrud-e Pain Rural District, Halab District, Ijrud County, Zanjan Province, Iran. At the 2006 census, its population was 157, in 40 families.
  ابراهیم)امیرحسین‌کابلی)بهترین فوتبالیست این روستا و این منطقه می باشد.
بهترین تیم این منطقه نیز المپیک پرافتخار می باشد

References 

Populated places in Ijrud County